IV is the fourth extended play by English rock band the 1975, released on 20 May 2013 through Dirty Hit and Polydor. It is the last of four EPs released before the band's debut album, The 1975. The song "The City" was re-recorded for this EP (listed as "single version"), and it is a longer version of the re-recorded version that appears on the debut album.

Interscope Records issued the EP in the United States by replacing every song but "The City" with songs from the band's previous singles. Interscope did issue "fallingforyou" backed with "Haunt //Bed" as a promotional 7" vinyl record as well.

Critical reception 
IV received near-positive reception. Sam Lawrie from Motion and Sound Magazine wrote: "The other-worldly sound is fascinating, and the appeal of The 1975 is obvious when they stand out so much in the alt-rock genre. On the other hand, it can also fail to make an impact, and that is a risk The 1975 have decided to take. Basically, you’ll either love it or you’ll hate it, but no doubt it’ll be another success in the fans’ eyes."

Musical Ramble rated the record 3.5/5, saying "I came into IV feeling skeptical that the seemingly schizophrenic personality of the band would eventually be their downfall, but came out pleasantly optimistic about what the album might be like.  The EP isn’t without its flaws and I still think the inclusion of 'The City' was a bad call considering it will be the last release before the album."

Track listing

Charts

References

External links

IV at YouTube (streamed copy where licensed)

2013 EPs
The 1975 EPs